Graham Bell may refer to:

Alexander Graham Bell (1847–1922), Scottish-born American inventor of the telephone
Graham Bell (artist) (1910–1943), South African painter and journalist
Graham Bell (singer) (1948–2008), English pop and rock singer
Graham Bell (biologist) (born 1949), English-Canadian evolutionary biologist
Graham Bell (footballer) (born 1955), English footballer
Graham Bell (skier) (born 1966), Olympic skier, TV presenter
Graham Bell (duo), Israeli DJ duo
Graham Bell (advocate), Scottish lawyer
Graham E. Bell, American amateur astronomer

See also 
Graeme Bell (1914–2012), Australian pianist and composer
Graeme Bell (Canadian football) (born 1980), Canadian football fullback
CGS Graham Bell, a 1929 tugboat shipwreck beached at Churchill Manitoba